Bibbiano (locally ) is a comune (municipality) in the Province of Reggio Emilia in the Italian region of Emilia-Romagna, located about  northwest of Bologna and about  southwest of Reggio Emilia.

Bibbiano borders the following municipalities: Cavriago, Montecchio Emilia, Quattro Castella, Reggio Emilia, San Polo d'Enza.

Physical geography
The municipal area, as well as the capital, is made up of the hamlets of Barco, Corniano, La Fossa, Ghiardo, and Piazzola for a total of 28.02 square kilometers. It borders Cavriago to the north, Reggio Emilia to the east, Quattro Castella and San Polo d'Enza to the south, and Montecchio Emilia to the west.

History
Traces of the first human presence (bottoms of huts, ceramic remains, copious siliceous artefacts) in Bibbiano date back to the period between the lower Paleolithic and the Neolithic. A long Gallic stay is attested by finds from the Iron Age and by the Celtic inflections which remain in the local dialect. The origin of the toponym is probably linked to the Roman occupation of the first century; numerous Roman finds have come to light following archaeological digs, including pottery and furnishings.

In the 12th century, the history of Bibbiano was inextricably linked to the Canossa family, as the municipal coat of arms demonstrates. The dominion of the Canossa dynasty on Bibbiano ended in the 18th century, when the fiefdom passed to the Marquis Gabbi (1757).

Bibbiano obtained municipal autonomy at the time of the Department of Crostolo.

In 2019, the town was the subject of a media scandal involving possibly false allegations of child abuse.

Culture 
Parmigiano Reggiano

The production of cow's milk cheese in the lands where Parmigiano-Reggiano is produced dates back to at least the 12th century. It is said that the monks of the Benedictine monastery of Corniano are the ones who discovered the recipe. This discovery marked an epochal change in the rural production of the region, which was until then limited to sheep's cheese.
For centuries, the dispute over where parmesan cheese was born has fascinated historians and cheese producers. However, most historians agree that the cradle of the renaissance of Parmigiano-Reggiano since 1700 is Bibbiano. The main reasons are quality forage, stable pastureland, availability of water, and the skill of Bibbiano cheesemakers.

In 2008, the consortium "Bibbiano la Culla" (Bibbiano, the cradle) was established to promote and enhance Bibbiano cheese with its own quality brand. The trademark has received a protected designation of origin.

Infrastructure and Transport 
Rail transport

The municipal area of Bibbiano is crossed by the Reggio Emilia-Ciano d'Enza railway; it is served by Barco station as well as six stops: Bibbiano, Bibbiano Fossa, Bibbiano Via Monti, Bivio Barco, Corniano, and Piazzola.

References

External links
 Official website

Cities and towns in Emilia-Romagna
Child sexual abuse in Italy